Scare Force One is the seventh studio album by Finnish rock band Lordi. It was released on 31 October 2014 via AFM Records.

The album's name and cover artwork is a pun on Air Force One.

Track list

Personnel 
Credits for Scare Force One adapted from liner notes.

Lordi
 Mr Lordi – vocals, artwork
 Amen – guitars
 OX – bass
 Mana – drums, backing vocals, recording
 Hella – keyboards, vocals

Backing vocals
 Tracy Lipp
 Katja Auvinen
 Riita Hyyppä
 Laura Ruohomäki
 Ralph Ruiz
 Pete Kangas
 Marko Ruohomäki

Production
 Mikko Karmila – production, engineering, mixing
 Mika Jussila – mastering
 Petri Haggrén – photography

Charts

References 

2014 albums
Lordi albums